Erith and Thamesmead is a constituency created in 1997 and represented in the House of Commons of the UK Parliament since 2019 by Abena Oppong-Asare of the Labour Party.

History
The seat was created for the 1997 general election from parts of the old Woolwich and Erith and Crayford constituencies.

John Austin was the MP for this constituency from its creation for the 1997 general election until he stepped down at the 2010 election. The seat was then held for Labour by a local activist Teresa Pearce, who defeated the Conservative candidate Colin Bloom, a councillor for Bickley ward in Bromley.

Pearce increased her majority at the 2015 general election to rank 125th of the party's 232 MPs then elected.

2010 Labour selection controversy
In April 2009, an investigation took place into the tampering of ballot boxes and abuse of the postal vote system used for the selection of the prospective Labour candidate for Erith and Thamesmead. A rerun of the candidate selection ballot resulted in victory for Teresa Pearce.

Constituency profile
The cross-border constituency of Erith and Thamesmead currently stretches from Plumstead, and Abbey Wood in the west, to Lesnes Heath, and Erith in the east. The Conservatives' strongest wards are in the Bexley part of the seat, in particular Northumberland Heath ward. The remaining wards from Bexley and Greenwich have traditionally seen more support for the Labour Party, in both local and national elections. There is a significant demographic divide within the seat, with Northumberland Heath being over 85% white, and Erith and Belvedere are also predominantly white. However, Thamesmead and Plumstead have much more diverse populations, where no single ethnic group has more than half of the population.

The eastern part of the seat includes significant areas of industry along the River Thames, including Crossness Sewage Treatment Works.

Boundaries

1997–2010: The London Borough of Bexley wards of Belvedere, Erith, Northumberland Heath, and Thamesmead East, and the London Borough of Greenwich wards of Abbey Wood, Eynsham, Glyndon, Lakedale, St Nicholas, and Thamesmead Moorings.

2010–present: The London Borough of Bexley wards of Belvedere, Erith, Lesnes Abbey, Northumberland Heath, and Thamesmead East, and the London Borough of Greenwich wards of Abbey Wood, Plumstead, and Thamesmead Moorings.

Boundary review
Following their review of parliamentary representation in South London, and as a consequence of changes to ward boundaries, the Boundary Commission for England recommended that parts of Glyndon ward and Colyers ward be transferred from Erith and Thamesmead to the constituencies of Greenwich and Woolwich and Bexleyheath and Crayford respectively; that part of Plumstead ward be transferred to Erith and Thamesmead from Eltham; and that parts of Lesnes Abbey ward, Nothumberland Heath ward and Erith ward be transferred to Erith and Thamesmead from Bexleyheath and Crayford.

Members of Parliament

Election results

Elections in the 2010s

Elections in the 2000s

Elections in the 1990s

See also
List of parliamentary constituencies in London

Notes

References

External links 
Politics Resources (Election results from 1922 onwards)
Electoral Calculus (Election results from 1955 onwards)

Politics of the London Borough of Bexley
Parliamentary constituencies in London
Constituencies of the Parliament of the United Kingdom established in 1997